Serhiy Shebek (born 14 June 1960, in the Ukrainian SSR of the Soviet Union) is a former Ukrainian football referee. He is a record holder for the most served football games in the Ukrainian Premier League with 226 matches. Shebek retired on December 31, 2008.

Key games
 2004 Ukrainian Cup Final

References

External links
 Profile at allplayers.in.ua
 Official salary of referees in the Higher League. champion.com.ua. 2006.
 Profile at fannet.org

1960 births
Living people
Sportspeople from Kyiv
Ukrainian football referees